Jonathan Kite (born September 2, 1979) is an American actor, comedian and impressionist. He is perhaps best known for his role as Oleg Golishevsky  on 2 Broke Girls.

Life and career
Kite grew up in Skokie, Illinois, the son of Lynn and David Kite. He attended Old Orchard Junior High and Niles North High School. He has a theater degree from the University of Illinois Urbana-Champaign. His family is Jewish.

From 2011 to 2017, Kite co-starred on the CBS sitcom 2 Broke Girls, playing the role of Oleg Golishevsky, the creepy Ukrainian cook who works at the diner. Other television work includes guest roles on Raising Hope, Kickin' It, American Dad!, The Life & Times of Tim, In the Flow with Affion Crockett, and Wizards of Waverly Place. In addition, he also appeared in several commercials such as spots for AT&T and Muscle Milk.

As a stand-up comedian, Kite is best known for his impersonations, boasting over 120 celebrity impressions that include Vince Vaughn, Tom Hanks, Barack Obama, Donald Trump, Robert Downey Jr., Seth Rogen, Mark Wahlberg, Ian McKellen, Jeff Bridges and Liam Neeson.

Outside of acting, Kite and his former 2 Broke Girls co-star Matthew Moy appeared on Hell's Kitchen when they attended dinner service in the Season 17 episode "Stars Heating Up Hell".

Kite voiced two characters in the animated show Cleopatra in Space: Octavian and Trumpet Guy.

Filmography

Film

Television

Video games

References

External links

Jonathan Kite on Instagram
Jonathan Kite on Twitter

1979 births
Living people
American impressionists (entertainers)
American male comedians
American male television actors
American male video game actors
American male voice actors
Comedians from Illinois
Male actors from Illinois
People from Skokie, Illinois
University of Illinois College of Fine and Applied Arts alumni
21st-century American comedians
21st-century American male actors